Pilgrim Soul is a song by British rock band, Feeder.

The song is from their album Pushing The Senses.  The song is written by singer, Grant Nicholas.  The bass player is Taka Hirose and the drummer is Mark Richardson. The track uses key changes as the verse-chorus-verse-chorus sequence continues.

Grant Nicholas said of the track:

External links
Feeder Official Website (FeederWeb)

Feeder songs
2005 songs
Songs written by Grant Nicholas
Song recordings produced by Ken Nelson (British record producer)